is a railway station serving two lines of the Osaka Metro in Asahi-ku, Osaka and Moriguchi in Osaka prefecture, Japan.

Lines
Taishibashi-Imaichi Station is served by the Osaka Metro Tanimachi Line (station number T13) and Imazatosuji Line (station number I14).

Station layout

Tanimachi Line
There is an island platform with two tracks underground.

Imazatosuji Line
There is an island platform with two tracks underground. The platform is fenced with platform screen doors.

External links

 Official Site - Tanimachi Line 
 Official Site - Tanimachi Line 

Asahi-ku, Osaka
Railway stations in Japan opened in 1977
Osaka Metro stations
Railway stations in Japan opened in 2006